Serrant is a surname. Notable people with the surname include:

Carl Serrant (born 1975), English footballer and fitness coach
Laura Serrant (born 1963), British nurse and academic
Maria-Frances Serrant (born 2002), Trinidadian footballer

See also
Serrano (surname)